Kildav is an unincorporated community and coal town in  Harlan County, Kentucky, United States. Its post office  is closed. The name is a combination of Killebrew and Davis, owners of the King Harlan Coal Company.

References

Unincorporated communities in Harlan County, Kentucky
Unincorporated communities in Kentucky
Coal towns in Kentucky